Mikhail Chernov (born November 11, 1978) is a Russian former professional ice hockey defenceman who played in the Russian Superleague and the Kontinental Hockey League.

Playing career
Chernov was drafted 103rd overall by the Philadelphia Flyers in the 1997 NHL Entry Draft, but spent three seasons playing in the American Hockey League for the Philadelphia Phantoms and never played in the National Hockey League.  He returned to Russia in 2001, splitting the season with Lokomotiv Yaroslavl and Spartak Moscow.  After a brief spell with Ak Bars Kazan, Chernov signed with Metallurg Novokuznetsk in 2003, where he spent two seasons.  In 2005, he signed with SKA St. Petersburg in another two-year spell which saw him achieve a career-high 17 points during 2006–07.  In 2007, Chernov joined Salavat Yulayev Ufa.

Career statistics

External links

1978 births
Ak Bars Kazan players
Metallurg Novokuznetsk players
HC Sibir Novosibirsk players
HC Spartak Moscow players
HC Vityaz players
Living people
Lokomotiv Yaroslavl players
Philadelphia Flyers draft picks
Philadelphia Phantoms players
Russian ice hockey defencemen
Salavat Yulaev Ufa players
SKA Saint Petersburg players
People from Prokopyevsk
Sportspeople from Kemerovo Oblast